Harry Maurice "Mick" Newman (2 April 1932 – 8 February 2022) was an English amateur footballer who played as an inside forward for Dagenham, West Ham United and Dartford.

Career
Born in Ontario, Canada, on 2 April 1932, Newman's family moved to England when he was three.

He played for Dagenham in the Delphian League in the early to mid-1950s, winning the title twice before joining West Ham United in February 1957 aged 24 and making his debut against Doncaster Rovers on 16 March 1957. He played for West Ham as an amateur, combining his footballing with his job in the family dry cleaning business. He played in the West Ham side which won the 1957-58 Second Division but played only three games that season scoring once, in a 6–1 win against Lincoln City at Sincil Bank. He played the following week, and scored again, in a 1–1 home draw against Ipswich Town. This was his last appearance in the Football League. He played only nine times in his West Ham career, scoring three goals. He signed for Dartford in 1958. Newman was the last player of amateur status to play for the West Ham first team.

Personal life and death
Newman was married with two daughters and died on 8 February 2022, at the age of 89.

References

1932 births
2022 deaths
Soccer people from Ontario
English footballers
Association football inside forwards
English Football League players
Dagenham F.C. players
West Ham United F.C. players
Dartford F.C. players
Canadian emigrants to England